Brad Buckley (born 1952 in Sydney) is an Australian artist, activist, urbanist and is a Professorial Fellow at Victorian College of the Arts, Faculty of Fine Arts and Music, the University of Melbourne. He is also a foundation research fellow at the Centre of Visual Art (CoVA) at the University of Melbourne. Buckley was previously, Professor of Contemporary Art and Culture at Sydney College of the Arts, University of Sydney. He has exhibited widely, with exhibitions across Australia, and globally in the United States, Germany, Canada, Poland, Japan, New Zealand, Israel and Norway. He has also written widely on contemporary art, art schools, curating and the neo-liberal influence on society. Buckley's writings have been published by Pluto Press Australia, NSCAD Press and Wiley-Blackwell.

Background
Buckley is a sixth-generation Australian, predominately of Irish and Celtic heritage and his immediate ancestors are a mix of lawyers and artisans. He spent his childhood years in Sydney before travelling and living in Europe and the United States during the 1970s and 1980s. He returned to live in New York (1990–1992) as an Australia Council of the Arts PS1 Institute for Contemporary Art/MoMA fellow.
His father, Jim Buckley, owned the Newcastle Hotel in Lower George Street, Sydney. The Newcastle was one of the Sydney Push 'hotels' – the Push members were also known as Libertarians – and was frequented by artists, poets, underworld figures and philosophers between 1956 and 1972.

He was educated at Saint Martins School of Art, London, and the prestigious Rhode Island School of Design, where he graduated with a Master of Fine Arts in 1982. While living in London, Buckley saw several plays by Samuel Beckett performed by Beckett's preferred leading actor, Billy Whitelaw, which had a profound influence on his thinking about art and the role it plays in the world.

Buckley has also been the chair of the board of Artspace Visual Arts Centre in Sydney, once during the 1980s and also again between 2001 and 2006.

Works
Buckley's works operate within an overarching schema entitled The Slaughterhouse Project, which is an aesthetic armature, a strategy used for aesthetic infiltration, or infection. As the name implies, the Project is a conceptual device of cauterisation, a way of exploring taboos, for investigating political anomalies, for venting dissatisfaction with social injustice. Operating at the intersection of installation, theatre and performance, investigates questions of cultural control, democracy, freedom and social responsibility, Buckley's work has been included in:
 the 3rd International Biennial (Ljubljana, Slovenia),
 the 4th Construction in Process 1993 (the Artists' Museum, Lodz, Poland), 
 the 5th Construction in Process 1995 (the Artists' Museum, Mitzpe Ramon, Israel),
 the 9th Biennale of Sydney, Australia, and
 The Deconsumptionists, Art as Archive, 2014 (Museum of Contemporary Art Detroit, US).

His work has been exhibited at:
 Franklin Furnace Archive (New York),
 Artspace (Auckland),
 the Art Gallery of New South Wales,
 the Kunstlerhaus Bethanien (Berlin),
 the Visual Arts Gallery (University of Alabama at Birmingham), 
 La Chambre Blanche (Quebec), 
 Artspace Visual Arts Centre (Sydney), 
 the PS 1 Institute for Contemporary Art (New York), 
 the Institute of Modern Art (Brisbane), 
 the Institute of Contemporary Art Newtown (ICAN) (Sydney), 
 the Dalhousie Art Gallery (Halifax, Canada), 
 Tsukuba Art Gallery (Japan), 
 Plato's Cave (New York), 
 The Australian Centre for Photography, and
 Reflex Wall Painting Project (Toowoomba, Australia).

His work has been cited in New Observations, Art + Text (Sydney), Flash Art (Milan), Artforum International, and Art in America. Buckley exhibited The Slaughterhouse Project: Alignment and Boundaries (L’Origine du monde) at the Australian Centre for Photography in 2013.

Curatorial work
Buckley has a longstanding interest in curating and has undertaken projects at the Museum of Art, the Rhode Island School of Design and the Institute of Modern Art in Brisbane. He co-curated with Blair French Reading and Writing Rooms, which was a major 30-year survey of New Zealand-born, Canada-based artist Bruce Barber, and was held in 2008 at Artspace Visual Arts Centre, Sydney. The project was developed in conjunction with Manukau Institute of Technology and Te Tuhi Centre for the Arts in Auckland, where a partner component of the exhibition opened in December of the same year.

His most recent curatorial project (co-curated with Helen Hyatt-Johnston, Couplings, was shown in 2018 at the Dominik Mersch Gallery, Sydney, Australia.

Academia
As a teacher at Sydney College of the Arts (1989–2017), Buckley has taught several generations of contemporary Australian artists working within painting, installation, performance and new media art, including Sean Lowry, Kyle Jenkins, Alex Gawronski, Tony Schwensen, Sarah Newall, David Haines, Mark Shorter, Rowan Conroy, Sylvia Schwenk, Shaun Gladwell, Ben Quilty, Koji Ryui, Justene Williams, Bijana Jancic, Dr Catherine Payne, Bronwyn Bancroft, Yiorgos Zafiriou, and Salvatore Panatteri.

Since 2003, Buckley has lectured and written widely on higher degrees and research in the art school context. In 2003, Buckley was invited to be the keynote speaker at the Visual Arts PhD Programs seminar at the Royal Danish Academy of Fine Arts. He was also a keynote speaker in 2007 at the International Symposium on Art and Design: University Art Practice and Research Funding, at the University of Tsukuba in Japan.
He also developed and convened, with Simone Douglas and senior faculty members, a conference on higher degrees and research in the art and design school context, entitled Evolution: Art and Design Research and the PhD, at The New School (New York) in October 2010. Buckley and Su Baker AM, Pro-Vice Chancellor and Director of the Centre of Visual Art, Victorian College of the Arts, the University of Melbourne, received in 2008–09 an Australian Learning and Teaching Council (ALTC) grant to undertake research into the impact of the PhD in visual arts in Australian universities over the past decade.

His commitment and contribution to graduate supervision was recognised in 2004 with the awarding of the first College of Humanities and Social Sciences (CHASS), the University of Sydney, Award for Excellence in Research, Higher Degree Supervision. In 2016, Buckley was awarded the Sydney University Postgraduate Representative Association (SUPRA) Supervisor of the Year Award. He has been a visiting artist and professor at numerous institutions throughout Asia, Europe and North America including the University of Tsukuba (Japan), National College of Art and Design (Dublin, Ireland), the Nova Scotia College of Art and Design University (Canada) and at the Royal Danish Academy of Fine Arts. During 2009 and 2013, Buckley was a visiting scholar at Parsons The New School for Design (New York).

Publishing projects
He is the editor, with John Conomos, of Republics of Ideas: Republicanism Culture Visual Arts (2001); Rethinking the Contemporary Art School: The Artist, the PhD and the Academy (2009), Ecologies of Invention (2013), Erasure: The Spectre of Cultural Memory (2015), Who Runs the Artworld: Money, Power and Ethics (2017), and A Companion to Curation (2020).

Buckley has also developed and chaired (with Conomos) a number of conference sessions for the College Art Association, including America: The Divine Empire (Atlanta, 2005), The Contemporary Collaborator in an Interdisciplinary World (Dallas, 2008), The Erasure of Contemporary Memory (New York, 2011) and Co-Chaired, with John Conomos, the session “The Delinquent Curator: has the curator failed contemporary art?”, 101st College Art Association (CAA) conference in New York City, 2013. His most recent conference which he chaired and developed Gatekeeping and Ethics in a Globalised Artworld, was held at the Centre of Visual Art (CoVA), at Victorian College of the Arts, Faculty of Fine Arts and Music, the University of Melbourne and the National Gallery of Victoria, Australia.

References

External links 
 Brad Buckley official website. 

Academic staff of the University of Melbourne
Australian artists
Artists from Sydney
1952 births
Living people